Scrobipalpa corsicamontes is a moth in the family Gelechiidae. It was described by Thierry Varenne and Jacques Nel in 2013. It is found on Corsica.

References

Scrobipalpa
Moths described in 2013